The 1984 Daytona 500, the 26th running of the event, was held February 19, 1984, at Daytona International Speedway in Daytona Beach, Florida. He won the race for the second year in a row, and the fourth time in his career, with an identical last-lap pass as the previous year, this time passing Darrell Waltrip who would later go on to win the same race in 1989.

This race would be the first Daytona 500 starts for Ken Ragan, Greg Sacks, Mike Alexander, Connie Saylor, Doug Heveron, Bobby Hillin, Jr., Hendrick Motorsports And Trevor Boys. It was the only Daytona 500 start for Dean Combs. This race would be the final Daytona 500 starts for Dean Roper, Ronnie Thomas, and Tommy Gale.

Speedweeks
Cale Yarborough and his crew chief Waddell Wilson were ready to repeat as Daytona 500 champion as Speedweeks got underway. Yarborough won the pole with a new track record. In the first Twin 125, 1980 Daytona 500 champ Buddy Baker was leading with 8 laps to go but did not want to be passed on the last lap. Baker slowed and forced Yarborough to pass. Yarborough took off and Baker could not catch him, winning by 1.8 seconds. In the second race, 1982 Daytona 500 champ Bobby Allison held off Harry Gant. A total of 72 cars participated in the Twin 125 mile qualifiers, with 36 in each race.

Calamity Corner
In 1984 Daytona's 4th turn was dubbed Calamity Corner after three violent accidents. Ricky Rudd was battered and bruised in a wild, tumbling, sidewinding crash in the Busch Clash, but he won two weeks later in Richmond (despite a concussion suffered in the Clash; there was no concussion rule, implemented in 2014, at the time). In the second Twin 125, Randy LaJoie spun off turn four. His car began flying and went underside-first into the inside wall (which Rudd had luckily just missed) before flipping end over end to a hard stop. LaJoie suffered back injuries.  The next day, in a consolation race for cars that failed to qualify for the big race, Natz Peters's car ricocheted off the inside wall into the path of another car, driven by Jim Hurlbert. Both cars exploded in flames. Neither driver was seriously injured.

Along with Waltrip's vicious crash at Daytona the previous year, by the time the Series returned to Daytona for the Firecracker 400 in July, the entire Turn 4 apron was paved over, the beginning of tracks paving aprons for cars to scrub off speed on asphalt aprons instead of grass, which did little to slow spinning cars.  The backstretch apron was paved in 1995, and following a serious incident at the 2015 Saturday support race for the Daytona 500 that injured Kyle Busch, the section of track past the tri-oval to Turn 1 was paved over and barriers realigned to temporarily seal off the road course during oval races.  In 2020, the Turn 4 apron became part of the track after a chicane was built in the area near the finish line was implemented to slow entrance speeds into Turn 1 of the road course.

Qualifying

Qualifying results

Failed to qualify

 = Daytona 500 rookie = Former Daytona 500 winner

Race Summary
President Ronald Reagan gave the command "Gentlemen, start your engines!" by phone from the White House. Yarborough, Allison, Dale Earnhardt and Richard Petty took turns leading the early laps of the race, but Petty and Allison fell out early with mechanical problems. Yarborough clearly had the strongest car, leading 51 of the first 100 laps. Yarborough's car was so fast, he twice passed leading cars on the outside of the third turn.

Yarborough led most of the second half of the race, but Earnhardt and Terry Labonte were also strong, as well as Bill Elliott and Darrell Waltrip, who lead for the first time on lap 142. Waltrip took the lead again on lap 162 during green flag pit stops. The race's final caution came at lap 177, but four leaders, Waltrip, Yarborough, Labonte and Earnhardt-decided to remain on the track and hold their positions.

After the race resumed on lap 183, six cars pulled away from the field. And as the final lap started, it was Waltrip, Yarborough, Earnhardt, Neil Bonnett, Harry Gant, and Bill Elliott. For 38 laps, Waltrip hung onto the lead. But he knew how fast Yarborough was. Yarborough made his move on the backstretch-the same move that had failed spectacularly in 1979 against Donnie Allison but worked perfectly in 1983 against Baker. Waltrip moved to the middle of the track but did not aggressively block. Yarborough made the pass without drafting help and immediately extended his lead to about 6 car-lengths.

Dale Earnhardt also moved on Waltrip but didn't begin his pass until turn four. He barely nipped Waltrip at the line, while Bonnett held off Elliott for fourth. Yarborough won by eight car lengths. And for the first time since Fireball Roberts in 1962, a single driver had led the most laps, won the pole, his qualifying race, and the 500. This made Yarborough become the only driver to win the Daytona 500 from the pole more than once until Elliott joined him after winning the following year and in 1987.

Race Results

Box Score

(5) Indicates 5 bonus points added to normal race points scored for leading 1 lap(10) Indicates 10 bonus points added to normal race points scored for leading 1 lap & leading the most laps

Cautions
7 for 39 laps

Lap leader breakdown

 = Daytona 500 rookie = Former Daytona 500 winner

References

External links
1984: A sweet repeat — NASCAR.com, January 28, 2003

Daytona 500
Daytona 500
Daytona 500
NASCAR races at Daytona International Speedway